Moroxydine is an antiviral drug that was originally developed in the 1950s as an influenza treatment. It has potential applications against a number of RNA and DNA viruses. Structurally moroxydine is a heterocyclic biguanidine.

It was reported in March 2014 that three kindergartens in two provinces of China had been found to be secretly dosing their students with moroxydine hydrochloride to try to prevent them from becoming ill. The kindergartens are paid only for the days that pupils attend and wanted to ensure that they maximised their earnings.

References

Anti–RNA virus drugs
Biguanides
4-Morpholinyl compunds